In the Good Old Summertime is a 1949 American Technicolor musical film directed by Robert Z. Leonard.  It stars Judy Garland, Van Johnson, S.Z. Sakall, Spring Byington, Clinton Sundberg, and Buster Keaton in his first featured film role at MGM since 1933.

The film is a musical adaptation of the 1940 film, The Shop Around the Corner, directed by Ernst Lubitsch, starring James Stewart, Margaret Sullavan, and Frank Morgan, and written by Miklós László, based on his 1937 play Parfumerie.  For In the Good Old Summertime, the locale has been changed from 1930s Budapest to turn-of-the-century Chicago, but the plot remains the same. The plot was also revived in the 1998 film You've Got Mail, starring Tom Hanks and Meg Ryan.

Plot
In turn-of-the century America, Andrew and Veronica are co-workers in a music shop who dislike one another during business hours but unwittingly carry on an anonymous romance through the mail.

Cast
 Judy Garland as Veronica Fisher
 Van Johnson as Andrew Delby Larkin
 S. Z. Sakall as Otto Oberkugen (as S.Z. 'Cuddles' Sakall)
 Spring Byington as Nellie Burke
 Clinton Sundberg as Rudy Hansen
 Buster Keaton as Hickey
 Marcia Van Dyke as Louise Parkson
 Lillian Bronson as Aunt Addie

Songs 
 "In the Good Old Summertime" (George Evans, Ren Shields)
 "Meet Me Tonight in Dreamland" (Leo Friedman, Beth Slater Whitson)
 "Put Your Arms Around Me, Honey" (Albert Von Tilzer, Junie McCree)
 "Play That Barbershop Chord" (Lewis Muir, Willam Tracey)
 "I Don't Care" (Harry Sutton, Jean Lenox)
 "Merry Christmas" (Fred Spielman, Janice Torre)

Production 
Garland introduced the Christmas song "Merry Christmas" in this film; it was later covered by Johnny Mathis, Bette Midler, and cabaret artist Connie Champagne.

Director Robert Leonard originally hired Buster Keaton as a gag-writer to help him devise a way for a violin to get broken that would be both comic and plausible. Keaton came up with an elaborate stunt that would achieve the desired result; however, Leonard realized Keaton was the only one who could execute it properly, so he cast him in the film. Keaton also devised the sequence in which Johnson inadvertently wrecks Garland's hat and coached Johnson intensively in how to perform the scene. This was the first MGM film that Keaton appeared in after having been fired from the studio in 1933.

The picture was filmed between November 1948 and January 1949.

Garland's three-year-old daughter, Liza Minnelli, makes her film debut, walking with her mother and Van Johnson in the film's closing shot.

The song "Last Night When We Were Young" was written in the 1930s by Harold Arlen and E. Y. "Yip" Harburg for the Metropolitan Opera star Lawrence Tibbett. Garland loved it and wanted to include it in the film. It was recorded and filmed but when the picture was released, it was cut from the final print. The audio recording of "Last Night When We Were Young" was featured on several of Garland's MGM record albums and she also later recorded it for Capitol Records in the 1950s. The entire footage of the number was found in the MGM vaults and included in the PBS documentary American Masters: Judy Garland: By Myself in 2004.

Reception 
The film was made during the height of the strained relationship between Garland and MGM. As a testament to Garland's strong popularity, it was a huge critical and commercial success. According to MGM records, it earned $2,892,000 in the US and Canada and $642,000 overseas, resulting in a profit of $601,000. According to Variety it earned $3.4 million in the US.

The film was the second to last one that Garland made at MGM (with the final being Summer Stock). MGM terminated her contract – by mutual agreement – in September 1950.

The film is recognized by American Film Institute in these lists:
 2006: AFI's Greatest Movie Musicals – Nominated

See also
 List of Christmas films

References

External links

 
 
 
 
 
 The Judy Garland Online Discography "In The Good Old Summertime" pages.
 NYT Overview
 The Judy Room "In The Good Old Summertime" filmography entry.

1949 films
1940s Christmas comedy films
1940s romantic musical films
1949 musical comedy films
1949 romantic comedy films
American Christmas comedy films
Remakes of American films
American musical comedy films
American romantic comedy films
American romantic musical films
Films based on adaptations
American films based on plays
Films based on works by Miklós László
Films directed by Buster Keaton 
Films directed by Robert Z. Leonard
Films produced by Joe Pasternak
Films scored by Georgie Stoll
Films set in Chicago
Films set in the 1900s
Metro-Goldwyn-Mayer films
Musical film remakes
Films with screenplays by Buster Keaton
1940s English-language films
1940s American films